Sher-e-Bangla Agricultural University (Sher-e-Bangla Krishi Bishwabidyaloy) or SAU (শেকৃবি) is the oldest agriculture educational institution in Bangladesh and South Asia. It is situated in Sher-e-Bangla Nagar, Dhaka. It was established on 11 December 1938 as Bengal Agricultural Institute (BAI) by Sher-e-Bangla A. K. Fazlul Haque, the then Chief Minister of undivided Bengal and later upgraded to university in 2001 renamed it as Sher-e-Bangla Agricultural University.

Since its establishment, the university plays a role in agricultural research and development (R&D) of the region through the creation of knowledge, agricultural technology generation and transfer, crop diversification and intensification for the benefit of farming communities. SAU offers undergraduate, post graduate, and Ph.D. degrees through course credit system.

History

SAU was established as Bengal Agricultural Institute (BAI) on 11 December 1938 by Sher-e-Bangla A. K. Fazlul Huq, the chief minister of undivided Bengal. The Bengal Agricultural Institute was renamed East Pakistan Agricultural Institute in 1947. After the emergence of Bangladesh as an independent country in 1971, the name of the institute was spontaneously changed to Bangladesh Agricultural Institute (BAI).

Since its inception in 1938, the BAI had been functioning as a Faculty of Agriculture under Dhaka University. After the establishment of Bangladesh Agricultural University (BAU) at Mymensingh in 1961 its academic function was transferred to BAU in 1964 until its upgrade to Sher-e-Bangla Agricultural University in 2001.

SAU became the 17th public university of the country in 2001. The Sher-e-Bangla Agricultural University Act 2001 was passed in the Parliament of Bangladesh on 9 July. The foundation stone was laid by the then Prime Minister Sheikh Hasina on 15 July 2001 and inaugurated the university activities through the appointment of the first vice-chancellor: Md. Shadat Ulla.

SAU functioned as a university from 2001 with a single faculty: the Faculty of Agriculture following the issuance of a notification by the government as per requirement of the Sher-e-Bangla Agricultural University Act 2001. On 22 June 2009, a bill was placed in the parliament to assign the president as chancellor. The Agribusiness Management , Animal Science & Veterinary Medicine and Fisheries, Aquaculture and Marine Science faculties started in 2007, 2012 and 2017.

Nearly 5,700 graduates plus 600 postgraduates have been produced by the Sher-e-Bangla Agricultural University. Presently about 3,300 undergraduate and postgraduate students are enrolled and are taught by faculty members.

List of Vice Chancellor

Campus
The campus surrounding is 87 acres of land. This campus is like a small village in the center of Dhaka city.

Infrastructure
 1 administrative building
 3 faculty building & complex
 Library
 Auditorium
 5 halls for students
 Poultry farm
 Machinery farm
 Research field (Agronomy, Horticulture, Genetics and plant breeding, plant pathology, etc.)
 Moshjid (mosque)
 Temple
 Cyber café
 Gymnasium
 Medical Center
 Cafeteria

Library
Sher-e-Bangla Agricultural University Library is in a separate three-storied building at the east wing of the administrative building. This library has a glorious history. It was established in 1938. Most probably, it is the first special library in Bangladesh.

The library has a collection of more than 40 thousand books comprising the major subjects of agriculture and related subjects. It also collects popular national journals related to agriculture and a few international journals. Students and teachers can borrow books; they use its reference books/journals during the opening hours. The library has 24 administrative personnel. It has been providing Internet service facilities to its users. It has a large number of electronic resource collections.

Recently the library has an interest in e-Resources. As a result, it subscribed to JSTOR, HINARI, AGORA, OARE, Oxford Scholarship Online, Pearsons, Taylor & Francis ebooks, CRCnetBase, Wiley Online, IMF e-Library, Emerald Insight, TEEAL, LiCob and it has an institutional repository. The university has built a Digital Archive on Agricultural Theses and Journals (DAATJ) under the funding of UGC-HEQEP.

Halls of residence
The Sher-e-Bangla Agricultural University has three halls for male and two for female students. Students either reside in or are attached to a hall of residence. A provost and an assistant provost looks after the administration of a hall.

Boy's dormitories
 Sher-e-Bangla Hall
 Nabab Siraj-Ud-Doula Hall
 Kabi Kazi Nazrul Islam Hall

Girl's dormitories
 Begum Fazilatunnesa Mujib Hall
 Krishokrotno Sheikh Hasina Hall

Academic

Faculties
 Faculty of Agriculture
 Faculty of Agribusiness Management
 BBA in Agribusiness
 BSC in Agricultural Economics
 Faculty of Animal Science and Veterinary Medicine
 Faculty of Fisheries, Aquaculture and Marine Science

Institutes
 Institute of Seed Technology

Admission

Undergraduate
From 2019 to 2020 Academic year a unified cluster system admission test is introduced in seven Universities which provide education in the field of Agricultural Sciences these are  Sher-e-Bangla Agricultural University, Bangabandhu Sheikh Mujibur Rahman Agricultural University, Bangladesh Agricultural University, Chittagong Veterinary and Animal Sciences University, Sylhet Agricultural University, Khulna Agricultural University and Patuakhali Science and Technology University. After then students get chance of admission as per their choice and score of merit list

Research organisation
 Sher-e-Bangla Agricultural University Research System (SAURES)
 Wazed Mia Research Centre

Research programs
New technologies are developed by potential researchers through Sher-e-Bangla Agricultural University Research System (SAURES). The Genetics and Plant Breeding Department has a major research thrust on development of new varieties of crops; identification of parental lines for hybrid development; molecular characterisation of crops and germplasm characterisation, documentation and preservation.

Convocation

The first convocation of the university took place on 16 November 2015. The President of Bangladesh, Md. Abdul Hamid was the chief guest of the convocation.

Publications
 SAU Barta
 Journal of Sher-e-Bangla Agricultural University

References

External links
 SAU Photo Archive
 SAU Library website
 University Grants Commission Bangladesh

Public universities of Bangladesh
Universities and colleges in Dhaka
Agricultural universities and colleges in Bangladesh
Educational institutions established in 1938
Sher-e-Bangla Agricultural University
1938 establishments in India